Alexander Parris (November 24, 1780 – June 16, 1852) was a prominent American architect-engineer. Beginning as a housewright, he evolved into an architect whose work transitioned from Federal style architecture to the later Greek Revival. Parris taught Ammi B. Young, and was among the group of architects influential in founding what would become the American Institute of Architects. He is also responsible for the designs of many lighthouses along the coastal Northeastern United States.

Early life and work
Parris was born in Halifax, Massachusetts. At the age of 16, he apprenticed to a housewright in Pembroke, but talent led him towards architecture. Married to Silvina Bonney Stetson in 1800, he moved to Portland, Maine, which was then experiencing a building boom. The city had been bombarded during the Revolution by the Royal Navy, reducing three-quarters to ashes in 1775. But following the war, its trade recovered, almost challenging Boston as the busiest port in New England. Parris received numerous residential and commercial commissions, working in the fashionable style of architect Charles Bulfinch. Like most housewrights of the era, he often used elements derived directly from English architectural books, or those published in the United States by Asher Benjamin. Unfortunately, some of his designs were lost in the Great Fire of 1866, but early photographs and Parris' surviving drawings bespeak works of neoclassical artistry and taste.

The boom would end, however, with Jefferson's Embargo of 1807, which lasted 14 months and devastated Portland's mercantile base.  Merchants went bankrupt. The Portland Bank, its building designed by Parris, failed. By 1809, construction in the city had come to a halt. Parris left for Richmond, Virginia, where he designed the Wickham House and the Executive Mansion. But architect Benjamin Latrobe examined Parris' preliminary plans for the Wickham House, which resembled his previous Federal style works in Portland, and gave it a blistering review. Latrobe's advice left a profound imprint on the future work of Parris, beginning with the building's revised design. Consequently, the Wickham House is considered a watershed design by Parris, marking the shift from his earlier Adamesque period towards his later, more severe, monumental and architectonic period. In the War of 1812, he served in Plattsburgh, New York as a Captain of the Artificers (engineers), gaining knowledge of military requirements for engineering.

Boston and federal patronage
In 1815, he moved to Boston, where he found a position in the office of Charles Bulfinch. Like his famous employer, Parris produced refined residences, churches and commercial buildings. When in 1817 Bulfinch was called to Washington to work on the U.S. Capitol Building, Parris helped complete the Bulfinch Building home of the Ether Dome at Massachusetts General Hospital. With Bulfinch's departure, Parris soon became the city's leading architect, and a proponent of what would be called "Boston Granite Style," with austere, monolithic stonework. Around 1818-1823 he kept an office on Court Street. He belonged to the Massachusetts Charitable Mechanic Association.

In 1824, however, he began a twenty-year association working for the Boston Navy Yard in Charlestown. He would end his career as chief engineer at the Portsmouth Naval Shipyard in Kittery, Maine. With the federal government as patron, Parris produced plans for numerous utilitarian structures, from storehouses to ropewalks, and was superintendent of construction at one of the nation's first drydocks, located at the Charlestown base. Today, he is fondly remembered for his stalwart stone lighthouses, commissioned by the U.S. Treasury Department. They are often of a tapered form termed "windswept."

Parris balanced the delicacy of his "superb draftsmanship," as it was called, with the coarseness of his building material of choice: granite. His most famous building, Quincy Market, is made of it. Parris died in Pembroke, where he is interred in the Briggs Burying Ground.

Designs

 1801 - Joseph Holt Ingraham House, Portland, Maine
 1803-1804 - Maine Fire & Marine Insurance Company Building, Portland, Maine
 1804 - James Deering House, Portland, Maine
 1805 - Commodore Edward Preble House, Portland, Maine
 1805 - Hunnewell-Shepley House, Portland, Maine
 1806-1807 - Portland Bank, Portland, Maine
 1807 - St. John's Church, Portsmouth, New Hampshire
 1809-1810 - Moses Payson House, Bath, New Hampshire
 1812 - Wickham House, Richmond, Virginia
 1813 - Executive Mansion, Richmond, Virginia
 1816 - Watertown Arsenal, Watertown, Massachusetts
 1818 - 39 and 40 Beacon Street, Boston, Massachusetts
 1819 - Cathedral Church of St. Paul, Boston, Massachusetts
 1819 - David Sears House (now the Somerset Club), Boston, Massachusetts
 1819 - Appleton-Parker House, or Nathan Appleton Residence, Boston, Massachusetts
 1822 - St. Paul's Episcopal Church, Windsor, Vermont
 1824 - Pilgrim Hall, Plymouth, Massachusetts
 1824-1826 - Quincy Market, Boston, Massachusetts
 1828 - United First Parish Church, Quincy, Massachusetts
1831 - Barnstable County Courthouse, Barnstable, Massachusetts
 1834 - St. Joseph's Church, Boston, Massachusetts
 1834 - Ropewalk, Boston Navy Yard, Charlestown, Massachusetts
 1836 - Chelsea Naval Hospital, Chelsea, Massachusetts
 1837 - Chelsea Naval Magazine, Chelsea, Massachusetts
 1839 - Saddleback Ledge Lighthouse, between the islands of Vinalhaven and Isle au Haut, Maine
 1847 - Mount Desert Rock Lighthouse, south of Mount Desert Island, Maine
 1848 - Libby Island Lighthouse, Machiasport, Maine, at the entrance to Machias Bay
 1848 - Matinicus Rock Lighthouse, 6 miles south of Matinicus Island, Maine
 1848 - Whitehead Island Lighthouse, Whitehead Island, Maine—southern entrance to Penobscot Bay
 1849 - Execution Rocks Lighthouse, Long Island Sound, New York
 1850 - Monhegan Island Lighthouse, Monhegan Island, Maine

References

 Richard M. Candee, "Maine Towns, Maine People -- Architecture and the Community, 1783-1820," a chapter in Maine in the Early Republic; Maine Historical Society & Maine Humanities Council; University Press of New England, Hanover & London 1988
 Arthur Gerrier, "Alexander Parris' Portland Years, 1801-1809," Landmarks Observer (Greater Portland Landmarks, Inc.), VIII, November–December 1981, pp. 10–11
 Edward F. Zimmer, Pamela J. Scott, "Alexander Parris, B. Henry Latrobe and the John Wickham House in Richmond, Virginia," The Journal of the Society of Architectural Historians, Vol. 41, No. 3 (October, 1982), pp. 202–211
The Bulfinch Building: State of the Art from the Start, R. Tomsho, Massachusetts General Hospital Magazine, 2011

External links

 Alexander Parris Digital Project
 Moses Payson House (1809-1810)
 Quincy Market (1824-1826), Boston, Massachusetts
 Wickham House (1812), Richmond Virginia
 Wickham House -- The Valentine Richmond History Center

1780 births
1852 deaths
American civil engineers
Architects from Boston
People from Halifax, Massachusetts
Federalist architects
19th century in Boston
Architects from Portland, Maine
Engineers from Maine
Engineers from Massachusetts
19th-century American architects
19th-century American engineers